When a World War I medal was issued to a member of Commonwealth forces, it was issued with a Service Number, Rank, Name and Regiment. This information should be on every medal that was issued during the First World War.

During World War I, there were four main medals issued: the 1914 Star, 1914-15 Star, Victory Medal, and the British War Medal.

Service Number 
From a service number it is sometimes possible to determine in which part of the army a medal holder served. However, this is not always the case.

Abbreviations for Rank and Unit
There are many abbreviations for the rank and unit. The British National archive gives full listings of both Ranks and Units.

Medal Card Abbreviations
 CRV - Certified Receipt Voucher

Theatres Of War

1 Western Europe
a France and Belgium
b Italy
2 Balkans
a Greek Macedonia, Serbia, Bulgaria and European Turkey
b Gallipoli (Dardanelles)
3 Russia (4–5 August 1914 to 1–2 July 1920)
4 Egypt
a 4–5 November 1914 to 18–19 March 1916
b 18–19 March 1916 to 31 October - 1 November 1918
5 Africa
a East Africa, Nyasaland and Northern Rhodesia
b South West Africa
c Cameroon
d Nigeria
e Togoland
6 Asia
a Hedjaz
b Mesopotamia
c Persia
d Trans Caspia
e South West Arabia
f Aden
g Frontier regions of India
h Tsingtau7 Australasia
a New Britain
b New Ireland
c Kaiser Wilhelmland
d Admiralty Islands
e Nauru
f German Samoa

Prefix letters and numbers
The following is an estimated list of all the Prefix Letter & Numbers (of what?).

Prefixes on medals issues to members of the New Zealand Expeditionary Force 
 1/ - Samoan Advance Force
 2/ - Artillery
 3/ - Medical Corps
 4/ - Engineers
 5/ - Service Corps
 6/ - Canterbury Infantry
 7/ - Canterbury Mounted Rifles
 8/ - Otago Rifles
 9/ - Otago Mounted Rifles
 10/ - Wellington Rifles
 11/ - Wellington Mounted Rifles
 12/ - Auckland Rifles
 13/ - Auckland Mounted Rifles
 14/ - Army Service Corps Divisional Train
 15/ - Headquarters Staff
 16/ - Maori Battalion
 17/ - Veterinary Corps
 18/ - Chaplains Department
 19/ - Samoan Relief Force, Infantry
 20/ - Samoan Relief Force, Mounted Rifles
 21/ - Army Pay Corps
 22/ - Nursing Service
 23/ - 1st Battalion, New Zealand Rifle Brigade
 24/ - 2nd Battalion, New Zealand Rifle Brigade
 25/ - 3rd Battalion, New Zealand Rifle Brigade
 26/ - 4th Battalion, New Zealand Rifle Brigade

Prefixes on Silver War Badge
 A - Australia Silver War Badge Prefix
 B - Unknown Silver War Badge Prefix
 I - India Silver War Badge Prefix
 MN - Merchant Navy Silver War Badge Prefix
 NZ - New Zealand Silver War Badge Prefix
 O - Unknown Silver War Badge Prefix
 RAF - Royal Air Force Silver War Badge Prefix
 RM - Royal Marines Silver War Badge Prefix
 RN - Royal Navy Silver War Badge Prefix
 SA - South Africa Silver War Badge Prefix

Others
 3/ - Seaforth Highlanders 3rd (Reserve) Battalion
 3/ - Duke of Cornwall's Light Infantry 3rd (Reserve) Battalion
 3/ - Royal Berkshire Regiment 3rd (Reserve) Battalion
 3/ - Gordon Highlanders 3rd (Reserve) Battalion
 3/ - Argyll and Sutherland Highlanders 3rd (Reserve) Battalion
 3/ - Royal Highlanders 3rd (Reserve) Battalion
 3/ - Cameron Highlanders 3rd (Reserve) Battalion
 4/ - Royal Irish Rifles 4th (Extra Reserve) Battalion
 5/ - Connaught Rangers 5th (Service) Battalion
 15/ - West Yorkshire Regiment 15th (Leeds Pals) Battalion
 A - Army Service Corps Old Army Special Reserve
 A - King's Royal Rifle Corps Early wartime recruits
 A - Royal Scots Fusiliers 3rd (Reserve) Battalion
 A - King's Own Scottish Borderers 3rd (Reserve) Battalion
 A - Highland Light Infantry 3rd (Reserve) Battalion
 A - Scottish Rifles 3rd (Reserve) Battalion
 A - Army Ordnance Corps
 A - Royal Fleet Reserve First period of enlistment
 A (HT) - Army Service Corps Horse Transport Special Reserve
 AA - Royal Naval Volunteer Reserve Anti-Aircraft
 ARMR - Army Ordnance Corps Armourer
 ASE / ASR - Army Service Corps
 B - Royal Fusiliers 26th (Banker's) Battalion
 B - Royal Fleet Reserve Second Period of Enlistment
 B - King's Royal Rifle Corps
 B - Highland Light Infantry 
 B - Scottish Rifles 4th (Special Reserve) Battalion
 B / BZ - Royal Naval Volunteer Reserve Bristol Division
 B - Army Service Corps Special Reserve
 B (HT) - Army Service Corps Horse Transport Special Reserve TF
 C - Royal Naval Volunteer Reserve Clyde Division
 C - King's Royal Rifle Corps 16th Battalion onwards enlistment
 C - Royal Fleet Reserve 3rd Period of Enlistment
 C - Royal Munster Fusiliers 1st Garrison Battalion
 C - Middlesex Regiment
 C - Rifle Brigade
 C - Royal Fleet Reserve Chatham / Royal Navy Chatham
 C (MT) - Army Service Corps Mechanical Transport Special Reserve
 CAT - Army Service Corps Caterpillar Mechanical Transport
 CH - Royal Marines Chatham Division / Royal Marine Light Infantry / Royal Fleet Reserve Chatham
 CH/RMP - Royal Marine Police Chatham
 CHT - Army Service Corps, Corps of Horse Transport
 CMT - Army Service Corps, Corps of Motor Transport
 CZ - Royal Naval Volunteer Reserve Clyde Division wartime enlistment
 D - Dragoons
 D - Royal Fleet Reserve Devonport
 D - Royal Navy Devonport
 DEAL - Royal Marines Deal Depot
 DEPOT / D - Royal Marine Light Infantry Deal Depot Permanent Staff
 DEV - Royal Fleet Reserve Devonport
 DM2 - Army Service Corps Mechanical Transport Learners, discontinued 11/16
 E - Royal Fusiliers 17th (Empire) Battalion
 E - Royal Naval Volunteer Reserve Birmingham Electrical Volunteers
 E - Army Service Corps Forage (ordinary rates of army pay)
 EX - Royal Marines Exton Division (World War II Only)
 F - Middlesex Regiment 17th & 23rd (Football) Battalions
 F - Royal Naval Air Service / Royal Navy Fleet Air Arm
 F - Army Service Corps Forage (not paid from Army Funds)
 G - Royal Irish Fusiliers 1st, 2nd 3rd (Garrison) Battalion
 G - Home Counties Regiments New Army men and later
 GOA - Royal Navy Goa
 GS - British Army General Service Enlistment
 GSR / GSSR - Royal Sussex Regiment Special Reserve, enlisted under hostilities only terms
 H - Hussars
 H - North Irish Horse Given to all on strength in mid-1917
 J - Royal Navy Seaman branch Prefix
 J - Royal Fusiliers 38th, 39th 40th, 42nd (Judean) Battalions
 J - Royal Navy Seamen and Communications
 K - "Kitchener battalion"???
 K - Royal Navy Stokers and Mechanicians
 K - Royal Fusiliers 22nd (Kensington) Battalion
 KP / KW / KX - Royal Naval Volunteer Reserve Crystal Palace Enlistment from Kitchener's New Armies
 L - Royal Naval Volunteer Reserve London Division
 L - Lancers
 L - Home Counties Regiments Regulars
 L - Royal Artillery Wartime enlistment
 L - South Wales Borderers 3rd (Reserve) Battalion
 L - Royal Navy Officers' Stewards, some Officers' Cooks
 L - Royal Navy Lee-on-Solent (FAA)
 LSR - Royal Sussex Regiment Special Reserve, enlisted under regular terms
 LZ - Royal Naval Volunteer Reserve London Division wartime enlistment
 M - Royal Naval Volunteer Reserve Mersey Division
 M - Army Service Corps Mechanical Transport
 M - Royal Navy Miscellaneous enlistments (e.g. writers etc.)
 M - Royal Navy Others - Artificers, Electrical, Supply etc.
 M1 & 2 /(SR) - Army Service Corps Enlisted Special Reserve for New Armies
 M1, 2 - Army Service Corps Mechanical Transport
 MALTA - Royal Navy Malta
 MB - Royal Naval Volunteer Reserve Motor Boat Reserve
 MC - Royal Naval Volunteer Reserve Mine Clearance Service
 MFA - Mercantile Fleet Auxiliary
 MS - Army Service Corps Mechanical Specials
 MZ - Royal Naval Volunteer Reserve Mersey Division wartime enlistment
 N - Royal Army Medical Corps
 O - Rifle Brigade
 P - Military Foot Police
 P - Royal Fleet Reserve Portsmouth / Royal Navy Portsmouth
 P - Dragoon Guards
 PET - Army Service Corps Petroleum Dept
 PLY - Royal Marines Plymouth Division RMLI
 PLY/RMP - Royal Marine Police Plymouth
 PO - Royal Marines Portsmouth Division RMLI
 PO/RMP - Royal Marine Police Portsmouth
 PO - Royal Fleet Reserve Portsmouth
 PS - Royal Fusiliers 18th, 19th, 20th & 21st (Public Schools) Battalions
 PS - Middlesex Regiment 16th (Public Schools) Battalion
 PW - Middlesex Regiment 18th, 19th & 26th (Public Works) Battalions
 PZ - Royal Naval Volunteer Reserve Crystal Palace Enlistment from civilian life
 R - Royal Naval Volunteer Reserve 
 R - Army Service Corps Remounts
 R - King's Royal Rifle Corps Later recruits up to 16th Battalion
 R4, RX4 - Army Service Corps 1st/2nd/3rd/4th New Armies Remounts
 RMA - Royal Marines Artillery
 RMB - Royal Marines Band
 RME - Royal Marines Engineers
 RS & R/TS - Army Service Corps Remount Specials
 RX - Army Service Corps Army Remount Section
 S - Royal Naval Volunteer Reserve Sussex Division
 S - Army Service Corps Supply Branch
 S - Scottish Regiments Wartime Enlistment
 S - Royal Army Medical Corps
 S - Royal Artillery
 S - Highland Regiments Wartime Enlistment
 S - Home Counties Regiments 3rd Battalion
 S - Rifle Brigade
 S - Royal Munster Fusiliers
 S - Army Ordnance Corps
 S - Dorset Regiment
 S1, 2, 3, 4 - Army Service Corps 1st/2nd/3rd/4th New Armies Supply (S4 Labour)
 SD - Sussex Regiment 11th, 12th & 13th (South Downs) Battalions
 SE - Army Veterinary Corps 9th Section
 SF - Royal Navy Fleet Air Arm (Short Service)
 SK - Royal Navy Stokers (Short Service)
 SM - Royal Navy Miscellaneous (Short Service)
 SPTS - Royal Fusiliers 23rd & 24th (Sportsman) Battalions
 SR - British Army Special Reserve ?
 SRMT - Army Service Corps Special Reserve Motor Transport
 SS - Army Service Corps Supply Specials
 SS - Royal Navy Seamen and Communications (Short Service)
 STK - Royal Fusiliers 10th (Stockbroker's) Battalion
 SWS - Royal Naval Volunteer Reserve Shore Wireless Service
 SZ - Royal Naval Volunteer Reserve Sussex Division wartime enlistment
 T - Army Service Corps Horse Transport
 T - Royal Naval Volunteer Reserve Tyne Division
 T - Army Ordnance Corps
 T / TF - Territorial Force
 T1 & 2/(SR) - Army Service Corps Enlisted Special Reserve for New Armies
 T1, 2, 3, 4 - Army Service Corps 1st/2nd/3rd/4th New Armies Horse Transport
 TR - Trimmer (Royal Navy, Mercantile Fleet Auxiliary etc.)
 TS - Army Service Corps Transport Specials
 TT - Army Veterinary Corps Territorial Force ?
 TZ - Royal Naval Volunteer Reserve Tyne Division wartime enlistment
 W - Royal Naval Volunteer Reserve Wales Division
 W - Cheshire Regiment 13th (Wirral) Battalion
 W - Royal Artillery 38th (Welsh) Division
 WR - Royal Engineers Waterways and Railways
 WT4 - Welsh Army Service Corps (see T4 above)
 WZ - Royal Naval Volunteer Reserve Wales Division wartime enlistment
 Y - Royal Naval Volunteer Reserve Deferred enlistment (replaced by divisional prefix on actual enlistment)
 Y - King's Royal Rifle Corps Early wartime enlistment
 Z - Rifle Brigade

Notes

References

External links
 Images of all WW1 medals, Worcestershire Medal Service Ltd web site

Australian campaign medals
New Zealand campaign medals
World War I